Cheongunhyoja-dong is a dong, neighbourhood of Jongno-gu in Seoul, South Korea.

External links
 Official website

Neighbourhoods of Jongno-gu